The team relay luge at the 2014 Winter Olympics was held on 13 February 2014 at the Sliding Center Sanki in Rzhanaya Polyana, Russia. This was the inaugural event of the team relay at the Olympics. The competition was won by Germany. Russia and Latvia won silver and bronze, respectively.

On December 22, 2017 Albert Demchenko and Tatiana Ivanova of Russia were banned for doping violations. Results of the Russian team were voided. They successfully appealed against the lifetime ban as well as annulment of result at the court of arbitration for sport, and on 1 February 2018 the results were restored.

Qualified teams

Results
The event started at 20:15.

References

Luge at the 2014 Winter Olympics
Mixed events at the 2014 Winter Olympics